The Cabinet of Aksel V. Johannesen is the current government of the Faroe Islands since 22 December 2022, with Aksel V. Johannesen from Social Democratic Party as Prime Minister, making a coalition between the Republic and Progress parties.

Composition

See also 
Cabinet of the Faroe Islands
List of members of the Løgting, 2022–current

References 

Cabinets of the Faroe Islands
2022 in the Faroe Islands